Chailey Heritage School is a special school located in North Chailey, East Sussex, England. It is owned and operated by the Chailey Heritage Foundation. The school is for children and young adults, aged between 3 and 19, with complex physical disabilities, including visual and hearing impairments, and associated learning difficulties. Some pupils have a profound learning disability in addition to other disabilities (PMLD).

History
Chailey Heritage School was initially set up as a school for disabled children and has since steadily evolved into a school for pupils with highly complex combination physical and cognitive issues.

Chailey Heritage Foundation and School was founded in 1903 by Grace Kimmins, who was moved by the many children born "crippled" (as it was termed then) and for whom education was non-existent. The plan was to build a school specifically for these children, in the countryside where the beauties of life could be experienced, which would educate and teach a craft to ensure independence in adulthood. It would be a school they would be proud to be part of and it would always be there for them in times of need – their Heritage.

She found an old workhouse at Chailey in East Sussex and on 6 June 1903 she arrived with seven boys. The pupils’ first task was to make a little wooden ladder, each rung representing achievement; their first writing test was "There’s always room at the top".

By 1936 the school had re-sited and expanded into a boys' school and a girls' school three miles away, still in Chailey – both equipped with operating theatres and medical facilities where education and treatment could be practised together.

The nationalisation of medical services led to the amicable split of medical and education. The two parts continue to work together – with Chailey Heritage School focused on education and Chailey Heritage Clinical Services on medical services. This partnership continues today, with the school and NHS service together on one site.

Chailey Heritage Clinical Services (CHCS)
Chailey Heritage Clinical Services (CHCS)  is the NHS service co-located with Chailey Heritage School to provide clinical and therapeutic input on site. In addition to their work at Chailey Heritage School they provide specialist services for children and young people with complex neurodisability throughout East and West Sussex.

Notable former pupils
Ian Dury – Musician and actor
Peter Hull – Paralympian
Alison Lapper – Artist

References

External links
Chailey Heritage School official website

Special schools in East Sussex
Educational institutions established in 1903
1903 establishments in England
Private schools in East Sussex